In digital signal processing, the term Discrete Fourier series (DFS) is any periodic discrete-time signal comprising harmonically-related (i.e. Fourier) discrete real sinusoids or discrete complex exponentials, combined by a weighted summation.  A specific example is the inverse discrete Fourier transform (inverse DFT).

Definition
The general form of a DFS is:

A common practice is to create a sequence of length  from a longer  sequence by partitioning it into -length segments and adding them together, pointwise.(see )  That produces one cycle of the periodic summation:

Because of periodicity, can be represented as a DFS with  unique coefficients that can be extracted by an -length DFT.   

The coefficients are useful because they are samples of the discrete-time Fourier transform (DTFT) of the  sequence:

With definitions   and :

Due to the N-periodicity of the  kernel, the summation can be "folded" as follows:

References

Fourier analysis